Ivan Vasilev (born 16 May 2001) is a Bulgarian footballer who plays as a forward for Yantra Gabrovo.

References

External links
 

Living people
2001 births
Bulgarian footballers
Bulgarian expatriate footballers
Bulgaria youth international footballers
Botev Plovdiv players
Fremad Amager players
First Professional Football League (Bulgaria) players
Association football forwards
Bulgarian expatriate sportspeople in Denmark
Expatriate men's footballers in Denmark